Spiranthes ochroleuca, commonly called the yellow nodding lady's tresses, is a species of orchid occurring from southeastern Canada to the eastern United States.

Distribution and habitat
Spiranthes ochroleuca is native in eastern Canada (New Brunswick, Nova Scotia, Ontario and Prince Edward Island), throughout the Northeastern United States, and in the southeastern United States (Kentucky, Maryland, North Carolina, South Carolina, Tennessee and Virginia). Its habitats include open woodlands, thickets, meadows, barrens, ledges, outcrops, banks and roadsides.

References 

ochroleuca
Flora of Eastern Canada
Flora of the Northeastern United States
Flora of the Southeastern United States
Orchids of Canada
Orchids of the United States
Flora without expected TNC conservation status